The César Award for Best Writing ( (1976-1982); César du meilleur scénario original ou adaptation (1986-2005) is a discontinued award given by the Académie des Arts et Techniques du Cinéma from 1976 to 2005. It was split into César Award for Best Original Screenplay and César Award for Best Adaptation in 2006.

Winners and nominees

1970s

1980s

The César Award for Best Adaptation and the César Award for Best Original Screenplay were awarded from 1983 to 1985.

1990s

2000s

See also
César Award for Best Adaptation
César Award for Best Original Screenplay
Academy Award for Best Adapted Screenplay
Academy Award for Best Original Screenplay
BAFTA Award for Best Adapted Screenplay
BAFTA Award for Best Original Screenplay

External links
 Official website 
 César Award for Best Writing at AlloCiné

Retired César Awards
Screenwriting awards for film